W.A.K.O. European Championships 2000 in Jesolo were the joint fifteen European kickboxing championships (the other was held in Moscow the same year) hosted by the W.A.K.O. organization and the sixth championships (world and European) to be held in Italy.  The event was open to amateur men and women from across Europe and there were three styles on offer; Low-Kick (men only), Light-Contact and Semi-Contact.  By the end of the championships the most successful nation was the hosts Italy, followed by Hungary in second and Kyrgyzstan in third.  The event was held over five days at the Palasport Cornaro in Jesolo, Italy starting on Wednesday, 18 October and ending on Sunday, 22 October 2000.

Low-Kick

Low-Kick is similar to Full-Contact kickboxing except that it allows kicks below the knee.  Matches are usually resolved by a point's decision or referee stoppage and as is common in amateur kickboxing, both fighters have to wear head and body protection – more detail on Low-Kick rules can be found at the W.A.K.O. website. At Jesolo the style was open to men only, with there being twelve weight classes ranging from 51 kg/112.2 lbs to over 91 kg/+200.2 lbs.  The most notable winner was Ivan Strugar who won his fifth gold medal at an amateur W.A.K.O. championships.  Kyrgyzstan was the top nation in Low-Kick winning four golds, one silver and two bronze medals.

Men's Low-Kick Kickboxing Medals Table

Light-Contact

Light-Contact is a form of kickboxing that is less physical than Full-Contact but more so than Semi-Contact and is often seen as a stepping stone between the two.  Fighters score points on the basis of speed and technique over brute force although stoppages can occur, and as with other amateur kickboxing styles head and body protection must be worn – more detail on Light-Contact rules can be found on the official W.A.K.O. website. The men had nine weight divisions in the style ranging from 57 kg/125.4 lbs to over 94 kg/+206.8 lbs while the women had six ranging from 50 kg/110 lbs to over 70 kg/154 lbs.  Notable winners at Jesolo included Dawid Kowalski, Martin Albers and Michal Wszelak who had all won gold medals at the last world championships in Caorle.  By the end of the championships Hungary was the most successful nation in Light-Contact, winning four gold medals, two silver and four bronze.

Men's Light-Contact Kickboxing Medals Table

Women's Light-Contact Kickboxing Medals Table

Semi-Contact

Semi-Contact is a form of kickboxing in which fights were won by points given due to technique, skill and speed, with physical force limited and as with other forms of amateur kickboxing, head and body protection is worn – more information on Semi-Contact can be found on the W.A.K.O. website. As with Light-Contact the men had nine weight divisions ranging from 57 kg/125.4 lbs to over 94 kg/+206.8 lbs while the women had six ranging from 50 kg/110 lbs to over 70 kg/154 lbs.  By the end of the championships Italy was by far the strongest nation in Semi-Contact picking up six golds, three silvers and two bronzes.

Men's Semi-Contact Kickboxing Medals Table

Women's Semi-Contact Kickboxing Medals Table

Overall Medals Standing (Top 5)

See also
List of WAKO Amateur European Championships
List of WAKO Amateur World Championships

References

External links
 WAKO World Association of Kickboxing Organizations Official Site

WAKO Amateur European Championships events
Kickboxing in Italy
2000 in kickboxing
Sport in Venice